Actress Alia Bhatt predominantly works in Hindi-language films. As a child, she made her  debut in a minor role in her father Mahesh Bhatt's production Sangharsh (1999), as the younger version of star Preity Zinta's character. In 2012, Bhatt had her first lead role in Karan Johar's teen film Student of the Year, but her performance in it was not well-received. Two years later, she gained praise for playing a kidnapping victim in the road drama Highway (2014), winning the Filmfare Critics Award for Best Actress. In the same year, her starring roles in the commercially successful romances 2 States and Humpty Sharma Ki Dulhania, both produced under Johar's studio Dharma Productions, established her as a leading actress. She also sang the single "Samjhawan Unplugged" for the latter film's soundtrack.

Bhatt had three notable releases in 2016, Kapoor & Sons, Dear Zindagi, and Udta Punjab, in which she played young women in troubling circumstances. Her performance in the last of these won her the Filmfare Award for Best Actress. Following another romantic role in Badrinath Ki Dulhania (2017), she played a spy in the thriller Raazi (2018) and the volatile girlfriend of an aspiring rapper in the musical drama Gully Boy (2019). She won two more Best Actress awards at Filmfare for the latter two. This was followed by two poorly received films, Kalank (2019) and Sadak 2 (2020). The year 2022 proved key for Bhatt as she gained further success with a brief role in the Telugu-language period film RRR, and starring roles in the fantasy film Brahmāstra: Part One – Shiva and biopic Gangubai Kathiawadi, in which she starred as the titular prostitute; all three rank among the highest-grossing Indian films of the year. She also produced and starred in the Netflix black comedy Darlings under her company Eternal Sunshine Productions.

Filmography

Films

Music videos

Discography

See also
List of awards and nominations received by Alia Bhatt

References

Indian filmographies
Actress filmographies